Marek Bęben (born 28 April 1958) is a retired Polish goalkeeper who played for Górnik Zabrze.

References

1958 births
Living people
Polish footballers
Association football goalkeepers
Górnik Zabrze players